The Giske Bridge is a concrete beam bridge between the islands of Valderøya and Giske in Giske Municipality in Møre og Romsdal county, Norway. The bridge has 11 spans.

Giske Bridge was opened in 1987 and had a toll until 2009. Together with the nearby undersea tunnels, the bridge is part of the Vigra Fixed Link which connects the islands of Giske Municipality with the nearby city of Ålesund.

See also
List of bridges in Norway
List of bridges in Norway by length
List of bridges
List of bridges by length

References

External links
A picture of Giske Bridge by night

Giske
Bridges in Møre og Romsdal
Bridges completed in 1987
Beam bridges
Concrete bridges
1987 establishments in Norway
Former toll bridges in Norway